Kidston Island is an uninhabited island in the Bras d'Or Lakes in Baddeck, Nova Scotia. The island is owned by the Village of Baddeck which leases it to the local Lions Club, which operates the beach on the island and the ferry to the island.

Features
The island features a lifeguarded beach operated by the Lions Club. The beach features a picnic area, changing rooms and washrooms.  The island is also home to the Kidston Island Lighthouse, an historic property located on the eastern tip of the island.

Access
Kidston island is accessible during the summer months via a 12-passenger ferry operated by the Lions Club.

History
In 1819, Lt. James Duffus (half pay Naval Officer), whose brother-in-law was Sir Samuel Cunard founder of the Cunard Line of steamships, founded his home on what is now Kidston Island. Duffus operated a mercantile business on the island, serving people from River Baddeck and Grand Narrows; customers were ferried to the island by canoe. Duffus died in 1833, and his former assistants operated the business for a little over two years. In 1836 the executors of his estate in Halifax sent William Kidston to wind up his business. Kidston met and ended up marrying Margaret Ann Duffus, widow of James Duffus, in 1836 and taking over the business. The Kidston business was moved to the mainland in 1840. A lighthouse was built on Kidston Island in 1875.  The present lighthouse was built in 1912 and the two stood side-by-side for some time. Eventually the island came to be owned by the Mersey Paper Company which sold it to the Village of Baddeck in 1959.

References

Islands of Nova Scotia
Uninhabited islands of Canada
Lions Clubs International